Woodlawn Leadership Academy, formerly Woodlawn High School, is a public senior high school in Shreveport, Louisiana, United States, and a part of the Caddo Parish Public Schools.

History 
The contract for construction of Woodlawn High was given to W. A. McMichael Construction Company in August 1958 with the final cost of construction in 1960 being $2,660,300. The school opened in September 1960 with 1,000 students. Woodlawn High School and the Caddo Parish School Board began integrating during the 1969–70 school year.

Athletics

Woodlawn Leadership Academy athletics
Woodlawn Leadership Academy athletics competes in the LHSAA.

Sports offered:
Football
Baseball
Boys' Basketball
Girls' Basketball
Cross-Country
Golf
Softball
Tennis
Boys' Track and Field
Girls' Track and Field
Volleyball
Cheerleaders

Woodlawn High School Athletics history

Championships
Football championships
(1) State Championships: 1968 (Class 3A)
(1) State Runners-Up: 1965 (Class 3A)

Boys' Basketball championships
(1) State Championships: 1972 (Class 4A)

Notable players
Woodlawn High School produced players that played in the "Big 3" of U.S. professional sports that are Major League Baseball, the National Basketball Association, and the National Football League. The school has multiple players inducted into professional sports halls-of-fame with players inducted into the both the Naismith Memorial Basketball Hall of Fame and Pro Football Hall of Fame.

Terry Bradshaw, NFL Hall of Fame member, sports analyst and actor. (NFL League MVP and two-time Super Bowl MVP)
Joe Ferguson, NFL player and hall of fame member. (NFL League passing and touchdowns leader, multiple seasons)
Lawrence Hart, NFL player
Shawn Jeter, MLB player
Vic Minor, NFL player
Robert Parish, NBA Hall of Fame member. (Nine-time NBA All-Star)

Notable coaches
Lee Hedges, football
Ken Ivy, boys' basketball
A. L. Williams, football

Notable people

Woodlawn Leadership Academy
Henry Black, NFL player
Donovan Wilson, NFL player

References

External links
 Official website

High schools in Shreveport, Louisiana
Public high schools in Louisiana